Patricia Erika Wolf (born July 2, 1974) is a Uruguayan model, actress and television personality.

Early life 
Patricia Erika Wolf was born in 1974, the daughter of Miguel Hugo, a German immigrant who arrived in Uruguay at the age of four in the early 1940s, and his wife María Teresa. Her childhood was spent in barrio Buceo, in Malvín and in Ciudad Vieja. She has two half-siblings from her parents' previous marriages, and a sister.

Filmography

Personal life 
She was married to businessman and presenter Daniel Puig, with whom she had her only son, Daniel Puig Wolf (born 1999). After divorcing, she began a relationship with Daniel Astori Sueiro, son of Danilo Astori, Vice President of the Republic from 2010 to 2015.

In May 2017, Wolf came out as bisexual, and confirmed that she was in a relationship with Agustina Zuásnabar, a businesswoman in the digital marketing sector. They got married on March 20, 2018, and celebrated their honeymoon in Tulum, Mexico. In early March 2021 it was confirmed that the couple had separated.

Wolf has supported environmental causes.

References

External links 

 
 

Uruguayan people of German descent
Uruguayan female models
Uruguayan television people
21st-century Uruguayan actresses
Uruguayan LGBT actors
Uruguayan bisexual people
LGBT media personalities
LGBT models
1974 births
Living people
Bisexual actresses